Judith Malina (June 4, 1926 – April 10, 2015) was a German-born American actress, director and writer. With her husband, Julian Beck, Malina co-founded The Living Theatre, a radical political theatre troupe that rose to prominence in New York City and Paris during the 1950s and 60s. The Living Theatre and its founders were the subject of the 1983 documentary Signals Through The Flames.

Early life and education
Malina was born in Kiel, Germany, the daughter of Polish Jewish parents: her mother, Rosel (née Zamora), was a former actress, and her father, Max Malina, a rabbi in the conservative denomination. In 1929 at the age of three, she immigrated with her parents to New York City.

Her parents helped her see how important political theatre was, as her father was trying to warn people of the Nazi menace and he left Germany with his family largely due to the rise of antisemitism there in the late 1920s.

Except for long tours, she lived in New York City until she moved in 2013 to the Lillian Booth Actors Home in Englewood, New Jersey. 1943 till 1945, Malina worked for Valeska Gert at the Beggar Bar. There she observed many of Gert's performances which influenced her later artistic approach. Interested in acting from an early age, she began attending the New School for Social Research in 1945 to study theatre under Erwin Piscator. Malina was greatly influenced by Piscator's philosophy of theatre which was similar to Bertolt Brecht's principles of "epic theatre" but went further in departing from traditional narrative forms. Piscator saw theatre as a form of political communication or agitprop ("Theatre interests me only when it is a matter of interest to society."); Malina, unlike Piscator, was committed to nonviolence and anarchism.

Career 

In 1963, they had to close the Living Theatre because of IRS charges (later proved false) of tax problems, and Malina and Beck were convicted of contempt of court, in part because Judith defended Julian wearing the garb of Portia from The Merchant of Venice – and tried to use a similar argument.

In 1969, the company decided to divide into three groups. One worked on the pop scene in London, another went to India to study traditional Indian theatre arts, and the third, including Malina and Beck, traveled in 1971 to Brazil to tour. They were imprisoned there on political charges for two months by the military government.

After Beck's death from cancer in 1985, company member Hanon Reznikov, who had become Malina's lover (they married in 1988), assumed co-leadership of the Living Theatre company. In 2007, it opened its own theater at 21 Clinton Street in Manhattan. In April 2008 Reznikov suffered a stroke and while hospitalized died of pneumonia on May 3 of the same year at the age of 57.

Malina appeared occasionally in films, beginning in 1975, when she played Al Pacino's mother in Dog Day Afternoon. Using her for the role was Pacino's idea, said its director, Sidney Lumet. Lumet recalls that tracking her down was difficult, as she had moved from New York to Vermont. "I had no idea of what to expect," said Lumet. "I didn't even know whether she'd want to do a 'commercial' film. Well, let me tell you, she is an actress. Totally professional. She also had no money and we had to pay her fare from Vermont, but she walked in and was perfect."

She also appeared in Pacino's Looking for Richard. Malina's other roles in cinema include Rose in Awakenings (1990) and Granny in The Addams Family (1991). She had major roles in Household Saints (1993) and the low-budget film, Nothing Really Happens (2003). She appeared in an episode of the TV series The Sopranos in 2006 as a nun, the secret mother of Paulie "Walnuts" Gualtieri. Malina took part in Rosa von Praunheim's documentary New York Memories (2010) and also in the documentary Love and Politics (2012) by Azad Jafarian. Von Praunheim's film premiered at the Berlin International Film Festival in 2010 and Azad's film premiered in 2012 at the Tribeca Film Festival. Malina also has a significant supporting role in the well-received film Enemies, A Love Story (1989), in which she acted alongside Lena Olin, Ron Silver and Anjelica Huston. Some of Malina's artistic qualities were described by theater scholar Richard Schechner:

Personal life and death

Malina met her long-time collaborator and husband, Julian Beck, in 1943, when she was 17 and he was a student at Yale University. Beck, originally a painter, came to share her interest in political theatre. In 1947, the couple founded The Living Theatre, which they directed together until Beck's death in 1985. Beck and Malina had "two offstage children", Garrick and Isha.

Malina's and Beck's marriage was non-monogamous. The bisexual Beck had a long-term male partner, as did Malina. In 1988, she married her long-term partner Hanon Resnikov. They co-directed the Living Theatre's activity in the Middle East, Europe and the United States, until Reznikov's unexpected death in 2008.

Malina died in Englewood, New Jersey, on April 10, 2015.

Awards and honors 
In 1996, Malina was awarded an honorary Doctor of Humane Letters (L.H.D.) degree from Whittier College.

Selected bibliography

 Entretiens avec le Living Théâtre (with Julian Beck and Jean-Jaques Lebel) (1969)
 We, The Living Theatre (with Julian Beck and Aldo Lastagmo) (1970)
 Paradise Now (with Julian Beck) (1971)
 The Enormous Despair, Diaries 1968–89 (New York: Random House, 1972)
 Le Legs de Cain: trois projets pilotes (with Julian Beck) (1972)
 Frankenstein (Venice Version) (with Julian Beck) (1972)
 Sette meditazioni sul sadomachismo politico (with Julian Beck) (1977)
 Living Heist Leben Theater (with Imke Buchholz) (1978)
 Diary excerpts Brazil 1970, Diary of Bologna 1977 (1979)
 Poems of a Wandering Jewess (book of poetry; Paris: Handshake Editions, 1982)
 The Diaries of Judith Malina: 1947–1957 (New York: Grove Press, 1984)
 Love & Politics (book of poetry; Detroit: Black & Red, 2001)
 The Piscator Notebook (London/NYC: Routledge, 2012)
 Full Moon Stages: Personal Notes from 50 Years in the Living Theatre (book of poetry; New York: Three Rooms Press, 2015)

Selected filmography
The Bachelor Party (1957) - Long-hair Village intellectual (uncredited)
Narcissus (1958) - Narration (voice)
Flaming Creatures (1963) - The Fascinating Woman
Queen of Sheba Meets the Atom Man (1963)
Après la Passion selon Sade (1968)
Wheel of Ashes (1968) - Crazy Woman Preaching
Candy (1968) - Bit Part
Love and Anger (1969) - (segment "Agonia")
Dog Day Afternoon (1975) - Mother
No Picnic (1986)
Radio Days (1987) - Mrs. Waldbaum
The Secret of My Success (1987) - Mrs. Meacham
China Girl (1987) - Mrs. Monte
American Stories, Food, Family and Philosophy (1989)
Enemies, A Love Story (1989) - Masha's Mother
Awakenings (1990) - Rose
The Addams Family (1991) - Grandmama
Household Saints (1993) - Carmela Santangelo
Men Lie (1994)
The Deli (1997) - Vincenza Amico
Music from Another Room (1998) - Clara Klammer
Snow Day (2000) - Grammy
Nothing Really Happens: Memories of Aging Strippers (2003) - Tillie Hirsch
When in Rome (2010) - Umberto's Grandma
New York Memories (2010) by Rosa von Praunheim
The Forgiveness of Judith Malina (2019)

Accolades
 2003, induction into the American Theater Hall of Fame.
 2008, annual Artistic Achievement Award from the New York Innovative Theatre Awards. This honor was presented to Malina by Olympia Dukakis on behalf of her peers and fellow artists of the Off-Off-Broadway community "in recognition of her unabashed pioneering spirit and unyielding dedication to her craft and the Off-Off-Broadway community".
 2009, the Edwin Booth Award from the Doctoral Theatre Students Association of the City University of New York.
 Other awards include an honorary doctorate from Lehman College, the Lola d'Annunzio award (1959); Page One Award (1960); Obie Award (1960, 1964, 1969, 1975, 1987, 1989, and 2007); Creative Arts Citation, Brandeis University (1961); Grand Prix du Théâtre des Nations (1961); Paris Critics Circle medallion (1961); Prix de L'Université de Paris (1961); New England Theater Conference Award (1962); Olympio Prize (1967); and a Guggenheim fellowship (1985).

References

External links

The Living Theatre official site

Judith Malina diaries, 1947-1959, held by the Billy Rose Theatre Division, New York Public Library for the Performing Arts
Living Theatre records, 1945-1991, held by the Billy Rose Theatre Division, New York Public Library for the Performing Arts
 

1926 births
2015 deaths
20th-century American actresses
20th-century American dramatists and playwrights
20th-century American women writers
20th-century German Jews
Activists from New York (state)
Actresses from New York City
American anarchists
American film actresses
American pacifists
American people of Polish-Jewish descent
American television actresses
American theatre directors
American women dramatists and playwrights
Anarchist writers
Deaths from lung disease
German emigrants to the United States
Jewish American actresses
Jewish American dramatists and playwrights
Jewish anarchists
Jewish pacifists
Jewish theatre directors
Jewish women writers
Women theatre directors
Writers from New York City